"Dead Run" is the second segment of the nineteenth episode from the first season (1985–86) of the television series The Twilight Zone. This segment is based on the short story "Dead Run" by Greg Bear, first published in Omni (April 1985). It follows a truck driver who gets a job transporting souls into Hell.

Plot
Johnny Davis is a truck driver unemployed due to his many accidents. Johnny asks Pete, a friend of his father, for help in getting a job. Pete warns Johnny that the jobs he takes require unusual fortitude. Johnny insists he has no alternative and Pete agrees to take him on his next run. Pete shows him that the job is to deliver souls to Hell via semi-trailer truck. At a truck stop, they observe other truckers are nervous about disturbances in Hell.

Dropping their cargo, Johnny is surprised that there is no punishment in Hell. Pete explains that Hell was not made for punishment, but to keep evildoers away from those who have chosen good. Souls run around loose and some plead with Johnny to rescue them. Other souls attack the drivers, but one of them, Gary Frick, comes to Johnny's aid. Gary tells Johnny he is an afterlife manager who was sent to Hell when he died, and has been starting an insurrection. Gary explains that a new bureaucracy has taken over the job of deciding who goes to Heaven or Hell, and confides to Johnny the location of the road to Heaven.

A guard sees Johnny with Gary and takes him to meet with upper management. Johnny relates what he heard and saw. The manager explains that God does not have time to personally judge the deceased. He points out that Johnny has no reason to believe the damned's claims that they are innocent, but Johnny still thinks his standards are too strict. He pretends to be convinced and is allowed to return to his job.

Johnny interviews the dead that ride with him and decides which of them should go to Hell and which he should release and show the road to Heaven. Johnny likens himself to Jesus, who descended into Hell to give the souls there another chance. He tells the freed souls that it is possible that from their perspective Heaven is actually worse than Hell, but it is their best chance.

References
 Zicree, Marc Scott: The Twilight Zone Companion. Sillman-James Press, 1982 (second edition)

External links
 

1986 American television episodes
The Twilight Zone (1985 TV series season 1) episodes
Television shows based on short fiction
Television episodes about the afterlife

fr:Le Convoi de la mort